DNA repair protein RAD51 homolog 4 is a protein that in humans is encoded by the RAD51L3 gene.

Function 

The protein encoded by this gene is a member of the RAD51 protein family. RAD51 family members are highly similar to bacterial RecA and Saccharomyces cerevisiae Rad51, which are known to be involved in the homologous recombination and repair of DNA. This protein forms a complex with several other members of the RAD51 family, including RAD51L1, RAD51L2, and XRCC2. The protein complex formed with this protein has been shown to catalyze homologous pairing between single- and double-stranded DNA, and is thought to play a role in the early stage of recombinational repair of DNA. Several alternatively spliced transcript variants of this gene have been described, but the biological validity of some of them has not been determined.

Interactions 

RAD51L3 has been shown to interact with:
 Bloom syndrome protein, 
 RAD51C, and
 XRCC2.

References

Further reading